Breaksea Island in King George Sound in the Great Southern region of Western Australia is  south-east of Albany.

Description

The island was declared a nature reserve in 1969) managed by the Department of Environment and Conservation; its reserve number is 27614. The island is also registered as a national estate.

History

The island was named by George Vancouver during his expedition in 1791. While in the area he also took possession of the lands for England. He named the island after its beaten appearance and the protection it offered to the landward side from the south-westerly winds.

In early April 1827, the island was visited by Major Edmund Lockyer, who found that the island, which had been previously assumed to be bare rock, actually featured between eight and ten acres of soil. He also noted the presence of seals, little penguins, sooty petrels, quail and bronze-winged pigeons.

Lighthouse 

A lighthouse was built on the island in 1858 by English convicts using pre-made cast iron sheeting. This lighthouse was replaced in 1902 by a cylindrical granite tower which remains in generally good condition. However, a major refurbishment taking 21 weeks was undertaken in early 2020, under a contract from the Australian Maritime Safety Authority (AMSA).

References

Islands of the Great Southern (Western Australia)
Nature reserves in Western Australia
King George Sound